William Barron, Jr. (March 27, 1927 – September 21, 1989) was an American jazz tenor and soprano saxophonist.

Barron was born in Philadelphia, Pennsylvania. He first appeared on a Cecil Taylor recording in 1959, and he later recorded extensively with Philly Joe Jones and co-led a post-bop quartet with Ted Curson. His younger brother, pianist Kenny Barron, appeared on all of the sessions that the elder Barron led. Other musicians he recorded with included Charles Mingus and Ollie Shearer.

Barron also directed a jazz workshop at the Children's Museum in Brooklyn, taught at City College of New York, and became the chairman of the music department at Wesleyan University. He recorded for Savoy, recording that label's last jazz record in 1972, and Muse. The Bill Barron Collection is housed at the Institute of Jazz Studies of the Rutgers University libraries.

Barron died in Middletown, Connecticut.

Discography

As leader
 The Tenor Stylings of Bill Barron (Savoy, 1961)
 Modern Windows (Savoy, 1962)
 West Side Story Bossa Nova  (Dauntless, 1963)
 Hot Line (Savoy, 1964)
 Now Hear This! (Audio Fidelity, 1964)
 Motivation (Savoy, 1972)
 Jazz Caper (Muse, 1982)
 Variations in Blue (Muse, 1983)
 The Next Plateau (Muse, 1989)
 Higher Ground (Joken, 1993)
 A Swedish-American Venture (Dragon, 2002)
 Live at Cobi's (SteepleChase, 2005)
 Live at Cobi's 2 (SteepleChase, 2006)

As sideman
With Ted Curson
 Plenty of Horn (Old Town, 1961)
 Tears for Dolphy (Fontana, 1965)
 The New Thing & the Blue Thing (Atlantic, 1965)
 Flip Top (Arista/Freedom, 1977)
 Snake Johnson (Chiaroscuro, 1981)

With Charlie Mingus
 Pre-Bird (Mercury, 1961)
 Jazz Makers (Mercury, 1963)
 Mingus Revisited (Limelight, 1965)
 Take the A Train (Back Up, 2006)

With others
 Kenny Barron, Lucifer (Muse, 1975)
 Ted Heath, London Stereo Laboratory Vol. 4 Big Band (London, 1974)
 Philly Joe Jones, Philly Joe's Beat (Atlantic, 1960)
 Philly Joe Jones, Showcase (Riverside, 1960)
 Cecil Taylor, Love for Sale (United Artists, 1959)
 Cecil Taylor, In Transition (Blue Note, 1975)

References

External links 
 Bill Barron at the Institute of Jazz Studies, Rutgers University

1927 births
1989 deaths
American jazz tenor saxophonists
American male saxophonists
American jazz soprano saxophonists
Savoy Records artists
SteepleChase Records artists
Muse Records artists
Chiaroscuro Records artists
Wesleyan University faculty
Musicians from Philadelphia
20th-century American saxophonists
Jazz musicians from Pennsylvania
20th-century American male musicians
American male jazz musicians
African-American jazz musicians
20th-century African-American musicians